Igor Yuryevich Boyarov (born 31 July 1991) is a former Russian professional football player.

Club career
He made his Russian Football National League debut for FC Sokol Saratov on 14 March 2015 in a game against FC Sakhalin Yuzhno-Sakhalinsk. That was his only season in the FNL.

External links
 
 
 

1991 births
Living people
Russian footballers
Association football forwards
FC Vityaz Podolsk players
FC Sokol Saratov players
FC Torpedo Moscow players
FC Sportakademklub Moscow players